Qian Changzhao (November 2, 1899 – October 14, 1988) was a Chinese male politician, who served as the vice chairperson of the Chinese People's Political Consultative Conference.

References 

1899 births
1988 deaths
Vice Chairpersons of the National Committee of the Chinese People's Political Consultative Conference